Christian Gottlieb Geyser (20 August 1742, in Görlitz – 24 March 1803, in Leipzig) was a German painter and copper engraver.

Life and work
His father, was a Lutheran theologian, as was his elder brother, . He began his law studies in 1761, at the University of Leipzig, but also took art lessons from Adam Friedrich Oeser. In 1764, when Oeser became the first Director of the newly founded Academy of Fine Arts, he hired Geyser as an assistant engraving teacher.

After 1770, he worked as an independent book illustrator. That same year, he was elected a member of the Dresden Academy of Fine Arts. The following year, he became a full member of the Leipzig Academy. He married Oeser's daughter, Wilhelmine, in 1787.

During his life, he was best known for his illustrations; some for first editions of works by Goethe and Wieland. These enabled him to purchase a country estate in Eutritzsch (now a part of Leipzig). where his family lived after 1792. His son, Gottlieb Wilhelm Geyser (1789–1865), who also became a graphic artist, later established a studio there. The building currently serves as a "Socio-Cultural Center", called the GeyserHaus.

He died of a stroke, while out taking a walk. His collection of engravings was auctioned off in 1804.

References

Further reading
 
 Neujahrsblätter der Bibliothek und des Archivs der Stadt Leipzig, J. B. Hirschfeld, Leipzig 1906

External links 

GeyserHaus Leipzig
Goethezeitportal: Christian Gottlieb Geyser

1742 births
1803 deaths
German engravers
German illustrators
Leipzig University alumni
People from Görlitz